Nandrolone phenylpropionate (NPP), or nandrolone phenpropionate, sold under the brand name Durabolin among others, is an androgen and anabolic steroid (AAS) medication which has been used primarily in the treatment of breast cancer and osteoporosis in women. It is given by injection into muscle once every week. Although it was widely used in the past, the drug has mostly been discontinued and hence is now mostly no longer available.

Side effects of NPP include symptoms of masculinization like acne, increased hair growth, voice changes, and increased sexual desire. The drug is a synthetic androgen and anabolic steroid and hence is an agonist of the androgen receptor (AR), the biological target of androgens like testosterone and dihydrotestosterone (DHT). It has strong anabolic effects and weak androgenic effects, which give it a mild side effect profile and make it especially suitable for use in women and children. NPP is a nandrolone ester and a long-lasting prodrug of nandrolone in the body.

NPP was first described in 1957 and was introduced for medical use in 1959. It was the first nandrolone ester to be introduced, followed by nandrolone decanoate in 1962, and has been one of the most widely used nandrolone esters. However, in more recent times, the drug has been largely superseded by nandrolone decanoate, which is longer-acting and more convenient to use. In addition to its medical use, NPP is used to improve physique and performance. The drug is a controlled substance in many countries and so non-medical use is generally illicit.

Medical uses

NPP has been used mainly in the treatment of advanced breast cancer in women and as an adjunct therapy for the treatment of senile or postmenopausal osteoporosis in women. Historically, it has also had a variety of other uses. Because of its reduced androgenic effects, the drug has not generally been used in androgen replacement therapy for androgen deficiency in men and has instead been used for solely for anabolic indications. However, nandrolone esters have more recently been proposed for the treatment of androgen deficiency in men due to favorable properties including their high ratio of anabolic to androgenic effects and consequent much lower risk of prostate enlargement, prostate cancer, and scalp hair loss relative to testosterone.

Available forms
NPP is or has been available 25 mg/mL and 50 mg/mL formulations in oil solution for intramuscular injection.

Non-medical uses

NPP is used for physique- and performance-enhancing purposes by competitive athletes, bodybuilders, and powerlifters. Nandrolone esters have been said to be the most popular AAS used by bodybuilders and in sports. This is in part due to the high ratio of anabolic to androgenic effect of nandrolone and its weak propensity for androgenic and estrogenic side effects.

Side effects

The most common side effects of NPP consist of virilization (masculinization) in women, including symptoms such as acne, hirsutism (increased body/facial hair growth), hoarseness of the voice, and voice deepening. However, relative to most other AAS, NPP has a greatly reduced propensity for virilization and such side effects are relatively uncommon at recommended dosages. At higher dosages and/or with long-term treatment they make increase in incidence and magnitude however. A variety of uncommon and rare side effects may also occur.

Interactions
Antiestrogens like aromatase inhibitors (e.g., anastrozole) and selective estrogen receptor modulators (e.g., tamoxifen, raloxifene) can interfere with and prevent the estrogenic effects of NPP. 5α-Reductase inhibitors like finasteride and dutasteride can prevent the inactivation of nandrolone in so-called "androgenic" tissues like the skin, hair follicles, and prostate gland and may therefore considerably increase its androgenic side effects. This is opposite to the case of most other AAS, which are either potentiated by 5α-reductase in such tissues or are not metabolized by 5α-reductase. Antiandrogens like cyproterone acetate, spironolactone, and bicalutamide can block both the anabolic and androgenic effects of NPP.

Pharmacology

Pharmacodynamics

NPP is a nandrolone ester, or a prodrug of nandrolone. As such, it is an androgen and anabolic steroid, or an agonist of the androgen receptor, the biological target of androgens like testosterone. Relative to testosterone, NPP has enhanced anabolic effects and reduced androgenic effects. In addition to its anabolic and androgenic activity, NPP has low estrogenic activity (via its metabolite estradiol) and moderate progestogenic activity. Like other AAS, NPP has antigonadotropic effects, which are due to both its androgenic and progestogenic activity.

Pharmacokinetics
NPP is converted into nandrolone in the body, which is the active form of the drug. It has an extended elimination half-life in the body when administered via intramuscular injection. Its duration of action is approximately one week and it is administered once every few days to once per week. The elimination half-life and duration of action of NPP are much shorter than those of nandrolone decanoate.

Chemistry

Nandrolone phenylpropionate, or nandrolone 17β-phenylpropionate, is a synthetic estrane steroid and a derivative of testosterone. It is an androgen ester; specifically, it is the C17β phenylpropionate ester of nandrolone (19-nortestosterone), which itself is the 19-demethylated analogue of testosterone.

History
NPP was first described in 1957 and was introduced for medical use in 1959. It was initially used for a wide variety of indications, but starting in the 1970s its use became more restricted and its main uses became the treatment of breast cancer and osteoporosis in women. Today, NPP is scarcely available. The drug was the first form of nandrolone to be introduced, and was followed by nandrolone decanoate in 1962, which has been more widely used in comparison.

Society and culture

Generic names
Nandrolone phenylpropionate is the generic name of the drug and its  while nandrolone phenpropionate is its . It has also been referred to as nandrolone phenylpropanoate or as nandrolone hydrocinnamate.

Brand names
NPP is or has been marketed under a variety of brand names including Durabolin, Fenobolin, Activin, Deca-Durabolin, Evabolin, Grothic, Hybolin Improved, Metabol, Nerobolil, Neurabol, Norabol, Noralone, Sintabolin, Strabolene, Superanabolon, and Turinabol.

Availability
NPP is or has been marketed in many countries throughout the world, including in the United States, the United Kingdom, and Canada.

United States

NPP was marketed previously in the United States but is no longer available in this country. Nandrolone decanoate, conversely, is one of the few AAS that remains available for medical use in this country.

Legal status
NPP, along with other AAS, is a schedule III controlled substance in the United States under the Controlled Substances Act.

References

Further reading

External links

Alkene derivatives
Androgens and anabolic steroids
Appetite stimulants
Enones
Estrogens
Nandrolone esters
Phenylpropionate esters
Prodrugs
Progestogens
World Anti-Doping Agency prohibited substances